Trap Door is a science-fiction fanzine published by Robert Lichtman, with the first issue appearing in October 1983.

History
It received nominations for the Hugo Award for Best Fanzine in 1987 and 1992.

The magazine is published irregularly and (especially in more recent years) infrequently.  As of December 2018, a total of 34 issues had been published.  Although it has never won a Hugo Award most likely due to its limited circulation not reaching enough Hugo Award voters the magazine is highly regarded and has won (or placed high) on various polls within the science-fiction fanzine subculture (such as the Fan Activity Achievement Award, which it won in 2000, 2004, 2010, 2011, 2013 and 2014).

A wide range of science-fiction fans and professionals have contributed to the magazine over the years.  This list is in the order of their first appearance:

 Chester Anderson
 Paul Williams
 Dan Steffan
 Redd Boggs
 Eric Mayer
 Larry Stark
 Brad Foster
 Jay Kinney
 William Rotsler
 Steve Stiles
 Arthur Thomson (ATom)
 Charles Burbee
 Lee Hoffman
 David Langford
 F. M. Busby
 Sidney Coleman
 Marta Randall
 Wilson "Bob" Tucker
 Steve Green
 Frederik Pohl
 John-Henri Holmberg
 rich brown
 Greg Benford
 James White
 Terry Carr
 Bob Shaw
 Carol Carr
 Karen Haber
 Chuch Harris 
 Calvin Demmon
 Geri Sullivan
 Gary Hubbard
 Shelby Vick
 Bill Kunkel
 Ray Nelson
 David Hartwell
 Ted White
 Ross Chamberlain
 Rob Hansen
 Teddy Harvia
 John Foyster
 Arnie Katz
 Candi Strecker
 Dale Speirs
 Jim Harmon
 Ron Bennett
 Richard Brandt
 Gregg Calkins
 John Hertz
 Bill Donaho
 Joe Kennedy
 William Breiding
 Boyd Raeburn
 Avram Davidson
 George Metzger
 Chris Priest
 Joel Nydahl
 Gordon Eklund
 Bob Silverberg
 Michael Dobson
 Bruce Townley
 Andrew Main
 John D. Berry
 Graham Charnock
 John Baxter
 Roy Kettle

See also

 Lists of magazines

References 

English-language magazines
Magazines established in 1983
Science fiction fanzines
Science fiction magazines published in the United States
Irregularly published magazines published in the United States